Gaby Dlugi-Winterberg  (4 December 1948 – 19 September 2014) was a German women's former footballer. She was a member of the Germany women's national football team from 1982–1983, playing eight matches. On club level she played for SSG 09 Bergisch Gladbach.

References

External links
 Profile at soccerdonna.de

1948 births
2014 deaths
German women's footballers
Sportspeople from Wuppertal
Germany women's international footballers
Women's association football defenders
Footballers from North Rhine-Westphalia